Chinaravuru is an area of Tenali in Guntur district of the Indian state of Andhra Pradesh. It is located in Tenali Mandal of Tenali revenue division. It has now become the attractive and one of the important parts of the  Tenali city. The park named Chinnaravuru park located here is the biggest attractive part of the Tenali. It forms a part of Andhra Pradesh Capital Region.

Geography 

Government and politics 
Chinaravuru gram panchayat is the local self-government of the village. There are wards, each represented by an elected ward member. The present sarpanch is vacant, elected indirectly by the ward members. The village is administered by the  Tenali Mandal Parishad at the intermediate level of panchayat raj institutions.

Demographics 

 census, Chinaravuru (rural) had a population of 5,058. The total population constitutes 2,553 males and 2,505 females —a sex ratio of 981 females per 1000 males. 524 children are in the age group of 0–6 years, of which 266 are boys and 258 are girls. The average literacy rate stands at 73.73% with 3,343 literates.

Transport 

Tenali–Kollur road passes through the village. Chinaravuru railway station is situated on the mutual Tenali-Repalle branch line and administered under Guntur railway division of South Central Railway zone. The nearest major railway station to the village is Tenali Junction. APSRTC Tenali operates the buses from the Chinnaravuru Bus stand to Tenali Bus stand, Mangalagiri, Vijayawada and many cities like Hyderabad and Visakhapatnam. The buses are very frequent to Tenali from the park.

Education 
Kendriya Vidyalaya, a central government school, was established in the village.

See also 
List of villages in Guntur district

References 

Villages in Guntur district